Cathedral of the Immaculate Conception, Taiyuan is a Roman Catholic church located in Xinghualing District of Taiyuan, Shanxi, China. It serves as the cathedral of the Roman Catholic Archdiocese of Taiyuan.

History 
The original church was built in Taiyuan in 1635 by Belgian Jesuit Jin Mige, during the Ming dynasty (1368–1644). It was confiscated during the reign of Yongzheng Emperor of the Qing dynasty (1644–1911). The church was rebuilt in 1870 by Bishop Luigi Moccagatta. In 1900, the Taiyuan massacre broke out, 45 Christian missionaries and village Christians were killed by local government, and the church was devastated by the Boxer Rebellion. In 2000, 26 deadly saints in Taiyuan diocese were canonized as Chinese saints by Pope John Paul II.

A restoration of the entire church complex was carried out in 1902 by Bishop Agapito Fioretii, and was completed in 1905. The church has survived the Second Sino-Japanese War and the Cultural Revolution.

In March 2013, it was listed among the seventh batch of "Major National Historical and Cultural Sites in Shanxi" by the State Council of China.

Gallery

References

Further reading 
 
 

Churches in Taiyuan
Tourist attractions in Taiyuan
1905 establishments in China
Roman Catholic cathedrals in China
Roman Catholic churches completed in 1905
Romanesque Revival church buildings in China